Bocşa may refer to several places:

In Romania:
 Bocșa, a town in Caraș-Severin County
 Bocșa, a commune in Sălaj County
 Bocșa, a village in Măciuca Commune, Vâlcea County
 Bocșa Mare and Bocșa Mică, villages in Certeju de Sus Commune, Hunedoara County

In Moldova:
 Bocșa, a village in Risipeni Commune, Fălești District

See also 
 Bócsa